German Run is a tributary of Little Muncy Creek in Lycoming County, Pennsylvania, in the United States. Part of the stream and one of its unnamed tributaries are designated as impaired waterbodies, with the source of the impairment being agriculture. German Run is classified as a Coldwater Fishery and a Migratory Fishery. Natural gas operations have occurred in the general vicinity of the stream.

Course

German Run begins on a hill between Buck Ridge and Northside Ridge in Franklin Township. It flows south through a valley for several tenths of a mile before receiving an unnamed tributary from the left and turning west-northwest for several tenths of a mile. In this reach, the stream receives an unnamed tributary from the right before turning west-southwest for several tenths of a mile, receiving two more unnamed tributaries from the right. It then turns southwest for several tenths of a mile, receiving one unnamed tributary from the left and one from the right before entering Moreland Township. Here, the stream turns west-southwest for several tenths of a mile and its valley becomes much shallower. It receives an unnamed tributary from the left before turning west-northwest. After a few tenths of a mile, the stream turns west-southwest for a few tenths of a mile, leaving its valley. An unnamed distributary then branches off, quickly joining Little Muncy Creek, while German Run itself turns south-southwest for several tenths of a mile, receiving another unnamed tributary from the left, before turning north and then west, quickly reaching its confluence with Little Muncy Creek.

Hydrology

A reach of German Run is designated as an impaired waterbody. The causes of the impairment are organic enrichment/low dissolved oxygen and sedimentation/siltation. The likely source of the impairment is agriculture. Part or all of an unnamed tributary known as Unt 19501 is also impaired, with the same causes and probable source.

Geography and geology

Watershed and biology
The mouth of the stream is in the United States Geological Survey quadrangle of Hughesville. However, its source is in the quadrangle of Lairdsville. The mouth of the stream is located within  of Moreland.

The designated use of German Run is aquatic life. The stream is classified as a Coldwater Fishery and a Migratory Fishery.

History
German Run was entered into the Geographic Names Information System on August 2, 1979. Its identifier in the Geographic Names Information System is 1175553.

In 2011, Chief Gathering, LLC. received a permit to built, maintain, and operate a  natural gas pipeline crossing several unnamed tributaries of German Run. In 2015, XTO Energy was fined $95,753 after casing and cementing problems in two of its natural gas wells in the area caused surface expressions of methane in German Run and Little Muncy Creek, as well as impacting seven private water wells.

See also
Broad Run (Little Muncy Creek), next tributary of Little Muncy Creek going downstream
Jakes Run (Little Muncy Creek), next tributary of Little Muncy Creek going upstream
List of rivers of Pennsylvania

References

Rivers of Lycoming County, Pennsylvania
Tributaries of Muncy Creek
Rivers of Pennsylvania